The flag of Tatarstan; (Flag Tatarstana); a republic of Russia, was introduced in 1991.

History 
The Supreme Council of the Tatar Soviet Socialist Republic adopted the flag on 29 November 1991 in its present form. It was designed by T.G. Khaziakhmetov.

The colours represent the Tatar majority and the Russian minority.

 The Red band symbolises the fight for happiness, bravery, and courage of the Tatar people.
 The White band symbolises peace, concord and an honest future between the Tatars and the Russians.
 The Green band symbolises hope, freedom, wealth and solidarity with Islam.

Tatar nationalists such as the All-Tatar Public Center use a different flag, divided diagonally by red and green and containing a white star and crescent in the center.

Proposed flags of Tatarstan

References

flag
Flags of the federal subjects of Russia
Flags introduced in 1991
Tatarstan